Geoff Austen (born 13 October 1953) is a former Australian rules footballer who played for Fitzroy and Collingwood in the Victorian Football League (VFL).

Austen, who was the son of league footballer Cecil, spent most of the 1970s in a struggling Fitzroy team. He got his chance to play at a stronger club in 1979 when he crossed to Collingwood and played a supportive role as Peter Moore rose to form and secured a Brownlow medal. 

At Preston in 1982, Austen immediately made his mark by winning the J. J. Liston Trophy. The following season he played in their Victorian Football Association premiership and he won the Norm Goss Memorial Medal as best afield in the Grand Final.

References

Holmesby, Russell and Main, Jim (2007). The Encyclopedia of AFL Footballers. 7th ed. Melbourne: Bas Publishing.

1953 births
Living people
Australian rules footballers from Victoria (Australia)
Fitzroy Football Club players
Collingwood Football Club players
Preston Football Club (VFA) players
J. J. Liston Trophy winners
Heidelberg Football Club players